Red Hall is a sports facility arena in Velenje, Slovenia. It is the home arena of handball club Gorenje Velenje. The venue can accommodate 2,500 spectators.

History
The construction of the venue began on 24 August 1974 and was finished in 1975. The Red Hall had its unofficial opening on 11 October 1975. At first, it was built to host different kinds of fairs, and not sports events.

After some modifications to the object, the government of Slovenia established the public company Sports and Recreation Center Red Hall on 25 May 1992. The venue was renovated a few times in its history, most recently in 2004.

Usage
Red Hall is a home arena of Gorenje Velenje (men's handball club) and ŽRK Velenje (women's handball club). It was also one of the four venues used for the 2004 European Men's Handball Championship.

References

External links
 

Handball venues in Slovenia
Indoor arenas in Slovenia
Sports venues completed in 1975
1975 establishments in Slovenia
20th-century architecture in Slovenia